The Continental Bank Building (now known as the Hotel Monaco) is a historic 13-story commercial building in downtown Salt Lake City, Utah, United States, that is listed on the National Register of Historic Places (NRHP).

Description
The building was constructed in 1923. The facade is eclectic, showing Second Renaissance Revival elements at the first two floors and utilitarian features above, and the building includes a modest, classical cornice. 

Designed by George W. Kelham in 1922, the building was constructed on the former site of the National Bank of the Republic after a merger of banks controlled by James E. Cosgriff. After Cosgriff's death in 1938, his son, Walter E. Cosgriff, eventually became president of the bank. The building became home to Kimpton Hotel Monaco in 1999. 

The Continental Bank Building was added to the NRHP December 27, 1982.

See also

 National Register of Historic Places listings in Salt Lake City

References

Further reading
 James E. Cosgriff, Weir-Cosgriff House, pp 50

External links

 Hotel Monaco website
 Bambara restaurant website

		

National Register of Historic Places in Salt Lake City
Second Renaissance Revival architecture
Buildings and structures completed in 1923